Tiana Metuarau (born 15 January 2001) is a New Zealand netball international. Between 2017 and 2020, she was a prominent member of the Central Pulse team that won the 2018 Super Club title and the 2019 and 2020 ANZ Premiership titles. In 2022, Metuarau was co-captain of the Pulse team that won a third ANZ Premiership title.

Early life, family and education
Metuarau is the daughter of Waimarama Taumaunu and George Metuarau. She has two siblings, Tuakana and Tanara. Her mother, Waimarama, is a former New Zealand netball international, former national team captain and head coach and Central Pulse's director of high performance. George Metuarau is a former rugby union player and coach. Between 2004 and 2011, he served as head coach of the Cook Islands national rugby sevens team. Between 2017 and 2019 he was a member of the Central Zone/Central Manawa coaching staff with responsibility for primary care.

Metuarau was born in Stevenage, Hertfordshire, England in 2001. At the time, her mother was serving as National Performance Director of the All England Netball Association. She is of Cook Island, Tahitian and Māori/Ngāti Porou descent. Her family returned to New Zealand when she was three years old. She attended Wellington East Girls' College.

Playing career

Central Zone
In 2016 and 2017, Metuarau played for Central Zone in the Beko Netball League. Her team mates included Karin Burger and Kimiora Poi. In 2016 she was a member of the Central Zone team that finished the season as runners up to Netball South. In the final, aged just 15, she scored 24 from 26. In 2017 she was a member of the Central Zone team that won the title.

Central Pulse
2016–2020
Ahead of the 2017 ANZ Premiership season season, Metuarau was included in the Central Pulse squad as a replacement for the pregnant Ameliaranne Ekenasio. Between 2017 and 2020 she was a prominent member of the Central Pulse team that won the 2018 Super Club title and the 2019 and 2020 ANZ Premiership titles. During this time, Metuarau played in four ANZ Premiership grand finals for Pulse. On 5 July 2020, during a 2020 Round 4 51–30 win over Waikato Bay of Plenty Magic, Metuarau, aged 19, made her 50th ANZ Premiership appearance for Pulse.

2021–
After spending the 2021 ANZ Premiership season playing for Southern Steel, Metuarau rejoined Central Pulse for the 2022 season. She was subsequently appointed Pulse co-captain along with Kelly Jury. In 2022, Metuarau was part of the Pulse team that won a third ANZ Premiership title.

Southern Steel
Ahead of the 2021 ANZ Premiership season season, Metuarau signed for Southern Steel. She made 16 appearances for Steel, scoring 221 goals with an 81% success rate. It was after her successful season with Steel that Metuarau was called up for the senior  2021–22 New Zealand squad. Metuarau played just one season for Steel before rejoining Central Pulse.

New Zealand
Metuarau represented New Zealand at schoolgirl level. She was just 16 when she a member of the New Zealand under-21 team that won the 2017 Netball World Youth Cup. She played the first half in the 60–57 win in the final over Australia. Metuarau was included in the senior 2021–22 New Zealand squad. She subsequently made her senior debut for New Zealand on 20 September 2021 against England during the first test of the 2021 Taini Jamison Trophy Series, scoring 17 from 19 as she partnered Maia Wilson. She was also named player of the match.

Statistics

Grand finals

ANZ Premiership

|- style="background-color: #eaeaea"
! scope="row" style="text-align:center" | 2017
|style="text-align:center;"|Pulse
|||?||22||212||?||5||14||81||71||17 
|- 
! scope="row" style="text-align:center" | 2018
|style="text-align:center;"|Pulse
|||?||7||136||?||3||6||68||72||16  
|- style="background-color: #eaeaea"
! scope="row" style="text-align:center" | 2019
|style="text-align:center;"|Pulse
|||90||2||38||108||1||2||45||43||13 
|- 
! scope="row" style="text-align:center" | 2020
|style="text-align:center;"|Pulse
|||72||5||69||107||1||3||45||34||13
|- style="background-color: #eaeaea"
! scope="row" style="text-align:center" | 2021
|style="text-align:center;"|Steel
|||252||24||321||366||5||20||85||101||16 
|- 
! scope="row" style="text-align:center" | 2022
|style="text-align:center;"|Pulse
|||209||14||218||270||5||26||92||83||16 
|- style="background-color: #eaeaea"
! scope="row" style="text-align:center" | 2023
|style="text-align:center;"|Pulse
||| ||  || || || || || || || 
|- class="sortbottom"
! colspan=2| Career
! 
! 
! 
! 
! 
! 
! 
! 
! 
! 
|}

Honours
New Zealand
Netball World Youth Cup
Winners: 2017
Central Pulse
ANZ Premiership
Winners: 2019, 2020, 2022 
Runners Up: 2017
Minor premiers: 2018, 2019, 2020, 2022
Netball New Zealand Super Club
Winners: 2018
Central Zone
National Netball League
Winners: 2017 
Runners Up: 2016

References

Living people
2001 births
New Zealand netball players
New Zealand international netball players
New Zealand international Fast5 players
National Netball League (New Zealand) players
Central Manawa players
ANZ Premiership players
Central Pulse players
Southern Steel players
New Zealand sportspeople of Cook Island descent
New Zealand people of French Polynesian descent
Ngāti Porou people
New Zealand Māori netball players
People educated at Wellington East Girls' College